The list of extinct cetaceans features the extinct genera and species of the order Cetacea. The cetaceans (whales, dolphins and porpoises) are descendants of land-living mammals, the even-toed ungulates. The earliest cetaceans were still hoofed mammals. These early cetaceans became gradually better adapted for swimming than for walking on land, finally evolving into fully marine cetaceans.

This list currently includes only fossil genera and species. However, the Atlantic population of gray whales (Eschrichtius robustus) became extinct in the 18th century, and the baiji (or Chinese river dolphin, Lipotes vexillifer) was declared "functionally extinct" after an expedition in late 2006 failed to find any in the Yangtze River.

Suborder Archaeoceti

Family Ambulocetidae
(Eocene)

 Ambulocetus
 Himalayacetus
 Gandakasia

Family Basilosauridae
(Late Eocene)

 Basilosaurinae
 Basilosaurus
 Basiloterus
 Eocetus
 Platyosphys
 Dorudontinae
 Ancalecetus
 Chrysocetus
 Cynthiacetus
 Dorudon
 Masracetus
 Ocucajea
 Saghacetus
 Supayacetus
 Zygorhiza
 Stromeriinae
 Stromerius

Family Kekenodontidae
(Oligocene)
 Kekenodon

Family Pakicetidae
(Early to Middle Eocene)

 Gandakasia
 Pakicetus
 Nalacetus
 Ichthyolestes

Family Protocetidae
(Eocene)

 Georgiacetinae
 Aegicetus
 Babiacetus
 Carolinacetus
 Georgiacetus
 Natchitochia
 Pappocetus
 Pontobasileus
 Tupelocetus
 Makaracetinae
 Makaracetus
 Protocetinae
 Aegyptocetus
 Artiocetus
 Crenatocetus
 Dhedacetus
 Gaviacetus
 Indocetus
 Kharodacetus
 Maiacetus
 Peregocetus
 Protocetus
 Qaisracetus
 Rodhocetus
 Takracetus
 Togocetus

Family Remingtonocetidae
(Eocene)
Andrewsiphius
Attockicetus
Dalanistes
Kutchicetus
Rayanistes
Remingtonocetus

Suborder Mysticeti

Family Llanocetidae
(Late Eocene-Early Oligocene)
 Llanocetus
 Mystacodon

Family Mammalodontidae
(jr synonym Janjucetidae)

(Late Oligocene)
 Janjucetus
 Mammalodon

Family incertae sedis
 Borealodon
 Coronodon

Clade Kinetomenta

Family Aetiocetidae

(Oligocene)

 Aetiocetus
 Ashorocetus
 Chonecetus
 Fucaia
 Morawanocetus
 Niparajacetus
 Salishicetus
 Willungacetus

Clade Chaeomysticeti

Family incertae sedis
 Horopeta
 Maiabalaena
 Sitsqwayk
 Tlaxcallicetus
 Toipahautea
 Whakakai

Superfamily Eomysticetoidea

Family Cetotheriopsidae
(Oligocene to Miocene)
 Cetotheriopsis

Family Eomysticetidae
(Oligocene to early Miocene)
 Eomysticetus
 Matapanui
 Micromysticetus
 Tohoraata
 Tokarahia
 Waharoa
 Yamatocetus

Family Aglaocetidae
(Miocene)
 Aglaocetus

Superfamily Balaenoidea

Family Balaenidae
(Miocene to Recent)
 Antwerpibalaena
 Archaeobalaena
 Balaena
 Balaena affinis
 Balaena arcuata
 Balaena larteti
 Balaena macrocephalus
 Balaena montalionis
 Balaena ricei
 Balaenella
 Balaenotus
 Balaenula
 Eubalaena (extant)
 Eubalaena ianitrix
 Eubalaena shinshuensis
 Idiocetus
 Peripolocetus
 Protobalaena

Family incertae sedis
 Morenocetus

Clade Thalassotherii
 Cetotheriomorphus
 Heterocetus
 Imerocetus
 Isocetus
 Notiocetus
 Otradnocetus
 Palaeobalaena
 Rhegnopsis

Family Cetotheriidae
(Miocene - Pliocene)

Classification follows Steeman (2007) unless otherwise noted.

 Brandtocetus
 Cephalotropis
 Cetotherium
 Ciuciulea
 Eucetotherium
 Halicetus
 Herentalia
 Herpetocetus
 Hibacetus
 Joumocetus
 Kurdalagonus
 Metopocetus
 Mithridatocetus
 Nannocetus
 Piscobalaena
 Thinocetus
 Titanocetus
 Tiucetus
 Vampalus
 Zygiocetus

Family Diorocetidae
(Miocene to Pliocene)
 Amphicetus
 Diorocetus
 Plesiocetopsis
 Uranocetus

Family Neobalaenidae
(Miocene to Recent)
 Miocaperea

Family Pelocetidae
(Miocene)
 Cophocetus
 Parietobalaena
 Pelocetus

Family incertae sedis
 Isanacetus
 Pinocetus
 Mauicetus
 Taikicetus
 Tiphyocetus

Superfamily Balaenopteroidea

 Eobalaenoptera

Family Balaenopteridae
(Miocene to Recent)
 Archaebalaenoptera
 Balaenoptera (extant)
 Balaenoptera bertae
 Balaenoptera cephalus
 Balaenoptera colcloughi
 Balaenoptera davidsonii
 Balaenoptera siberi
 Balaenoptera sursiplana
 Balaenoptera taiwanica
 "Balaenoptera" cortesii
 "Balaenoptera" portisi
 "Balaenoptera" ryani
 Burtinopsis
 Cetotheriophanes
 Fragilicetus
 Incakujira
 Miobalaenoptera
 Norrisanima
 Nehalaennia
 Parabalaenoptera
 Plesiobalaenoptera
 Plesiocetus
 Praemegaptera
 Protororqualus

Family Eschrichtiidae
(Miocene to Recent)
 Archaeschrichtius
 Eschrichtioides
 Gricetoides
 Megapteropsis

Family Tranatocetidae
 Mesocetus
 Mixocetus
 Tranatocetus

Family incertae sedis
 Mioceta (nomen dubium)
 Piscocetus
 Siphonocetus (nomen dubium)
 Tretulias (nomen dubium)
 Ulias (nomen dubium)

Suborder Odontoceti

Basal forms

Family Agorophiidae
(Early Oligocene)
 Agorophius

Family Ashleycetidae
(Early Oligocene)
 Ashleycetus

Family Patriocetidae
(Oligocene to Early Miocene)
 Patriocetus

Family Simocetidae
(Early Oligocene)
 Simocetus

Family Xenorophidae
(Late Oligocene)
 Albertocetus
 Archaeodelphis
 Cotylocara
 Echovenator
 Inermorostrum
 Mirocetus
 Xenorophus

Family Inticetidae
 Inticetus
 Phococetus

Family Microzeuglodontidae
 Microzeuglodon

Family Squaloziphiidae
(Late Oligocene to Early Miocene)
 Squaloziphius
 Yaquinacetus

Family incertae sedis
 Ankylorhiza
 Agriocetus
 Atropatenocetus
 Ediscetus
 Olympicetus
 Saurocetus

Superfamily Squalodontoidea

Family Dalpiazinidae
(Late Oligocene to Miocene)
 Dalpiazina

Family Prosqualodontidae
(Late Oligocene-Middle Miocene)
 Parasqualodon
 Prosqualodon

Superfamily Physeteroidea

Family Kogiidae
(Miocene to recent)
 Aprixokogia
 Kogia (extant)
 Kogia pusilla
 Kogia danomurai
 Kogiopsis
 Koristocetus
 Nanokogia
 Pliokogia
 Praekogia
 Scaphokogia
 Thalassocetus

Family Physeteridae
 Ferecetotherium
 Idiophyseter
 Idiorophus
 Orycterocetus
 Physeterula
 Placoziphius
 Preaulophyseter
 Scaldicetus

Family incertae sedis
 Acrophyseter
 Albicetus
 Aulophyseter
 Brygmophyseter
 Diaphorocetus
 Eudelphis
 Hoplocetus (nomen dubium)
 Livyatan 
 Miokogia (nomen dubium)
 Paleophoca (nomen dubium)
 Prophyseter (nomen dubium)
 Zygophyseter

Superfamily "Eurhinodelphinoidea"

Family Argyrocetidae
(Late Oligocene to Early Miocene)
 Argyrocetus
 Chilcacetus
 Macrodelphinus

Family Eoplatanistidae
(Miocene)
 Eoplatanista

Family Eurhinodelphinidae
(Late Oligocene to Late Miocene)

 Ceterhinops
 Eurhinodelphis
 Iniopsis
 Mycteriacetus
 Phocaenopsis
 Schizodelphis
 Vanbreenia
 Xiphiacetus
 Ziphiodelphis

Superfamily Platanistoidea
 Aondelphis
 Awamokoa
 Dolgopolis
 Ensidelphis
 Perditicetus
 Urkudelphis

Family Allodelphinidae
(Late Oligocene to Middle Miocene)
 Allodelphis
 Arktocara
 Goedertius
 Ninjadelphis
 Zarhinocetus

Family Platanistidae
(Early Miocene to Recent)
 Araeodelphis
 Dilophodelphis
 Pachyacanthus
 Pomatodelphis
 Prepomatodelphis
 Zarhachis

Family Squalodelphinidae
(Late Oligocene to Middle Miocene)
 Furcadelphis
 Huaridelphis
 Macrosqualodelphis
 Medocinia
 Notocetus
 Phocageneus
 Squalodelphis

Family Squalodontidae
(Late Oligocene to Middle Miocene)
 Austrosqualodon
 Eosqualodon
 Macrophoca
 Neosqualodon
 Pachyodon
 Phoberodon
 Squalodon (syn. Kelloggia, Rhizoprion, Crenidelphinus, Arionius, Phocodon)
 Smilocamptus
 Tangaroasaurus

Family Waipatiidae
(Late Oligocene to Early Miocene) 
 ?Microcetus
 Otekaikea
 Papahu
 Sachalinocetus
 Waipatia

Superfamily Ziphioidea

Family Ziphiidae
(Miocene to Recent)

 Basal forms
 Aporotus
 Beneziphius
 Chavinziphius
 Chimuziphius
 Choneziphius
 Dagonodum
 Globicetus
 Imocetus
 Messapicetus
 Ninoziphius
 Notoziphius
 Tusciziphius
 Ziphirostrum
 Subfamily Berardiinae
 Archaeoziphius
 Microberardius
 Subfamily Hyperoodontinae
 Africanacetus
 Belemnoziphius
 Ihlengesi
 Khoikhoicetus
 Mesoplodon (extant)
 Mesoplodon posti
 Mesoplodon slangkopi
 Mesoplodon tumidirostris
 Nenga
 Pterocetus
 Xhosacetus
 Subfamily Ziphiinae
 Caviziphius
 Izikoziphius
 Nazcacetus
 Subfamily incertae sedis
 Anoplonassa
 Cetorhynchus
 Eboroziphius
 Pelycorhamphus

Clade Delphinida

Family incertae sedis
 Anacharsis
 Belonodelphis
 Delphinavus
 Graamocetus
 Hadrodelphis
 Lamprolithax
 Leptodelphis
 Liolithax
 Lophocetus
 Loxolithax
 Macrokentriodon
 Microphocaena
 Miodelphis
 Nannolithax
 Oedolithax
 Oligodelphis
 Palaeophocaena
 Pithanodelphis
 Platylithax
 Prionodelphis
 Protodelphinus
 Sarmatodelphis
 Sophianacetus
 Tagicetus

Superfamily Delphinoidea

Family Albireonidae
(Miocene to Pliocene)
 Albireo

Family Delphinidae
 
(Oligocene to Recent)
 Arimidelphis
 Astadelphis
 Australodelphis
 Delphinus (extant)
 Delphinus domeykoi
 Eodelphinus
 Etruridelphis
 Hemisyntrachelus
 Lagenorhynchus (extant)
 Lagenorhynchus harmatuki
 Norisdelphis
 Globicephala (extant)
 Globicephala baereckeii
 Globicephala etruriae
 Orcinus (extant)
 Orcinus citoniensis
 Orcinus meyeri
 Orcinus paleorca
 Platalearostrum
 Protoglobicephala
 Pseudorca (extant)
 Pseudorca yokoyamai
 Pseudorca yuanliensis
 Septidelphis
 Sinanodelphis
 Stenella (extant)
 Stenella rayi
 Tursiops (extant)
 Tursiops miocaenus
 Tursiops osennae

Family Kentriodontidae
(Oligocene to Pliocene)

 Kampholophos
 Kentriodon
 Rudicetus
 Sophianaecetus
 Wimahl
 Belonodelphis?
 Liolithax?

Family Monodontidae
(Miocene to Recent)
 Bohaskaia
 Casatia
 Denebola
 Haborodelphis

Family Odobenocetopsidae
(Late Miocene to Early Pliocene)

 Odobenocetops

Family Phocoenidae
(Miocene to Recent)
 Archaeophocaena
 Australithax
 Brabocetus
 Harborophocoena
 Lomacetus
 Miophocaena
 Numataphocoena
 Piscolithax
 Pterophocaena
 Salumiphocaena
 Semirostrum
 Septemtriocetus

Superfamily Inioidea
 Awadelphis
 Brujadelphis
 Incacetus
 Meherrinia

Family Iniidae
(Miocene to Recent)
 Goniodelphis
 Hesperoinia
 Ischyrorhynchus
 Isthminia
 Kwanzacetus
 Saurocetes

Family Pontoporiidae
(Middle Miocene to Recent)
 Atocetus
 Auroracetus
 Brachydelphis
 Pliopontos
 Pontistes
 Protophocaena
 Scaldiporia
 Stenasodelphis

Superfamily Lipotoidea

Family Lipotidae
(Late Miocene to Recent)
 Parapontoporia

Superfamily incertae sedis
 Delphinodon
 Heterodelphis

Family incertae sedis
 Acrodelphis
 Champsodelphis
 Hesperocetus
 Imerodelphis (Miocene)
 Kharthlidelphis
 Lonchodelphis
 Macrochirifer
 Microsqualodon
 Pelodelphis
 Rhabdosteus (nomen dubium)
 Sulakocetus

See also 

 Evolution of cetaceans
 List of cetaceans
 List of prehistoric mammals
 Lists of extinct species

References 

Extinct
Cetaceans, extinct
Cetaceans
Cetaceans, extinct